"Chill Bill" is a song by American hip hop recording artist Rob Stone. The music video was put out on YouTube on June 25, 2015. The song was premiered on March 15, 2015 on YouTube on the account of nuca chitiashvili . The song features vocals from fellow American rappers J. Davis and Spooks, and was released as Stone's commercial debut single on June 17, 2016 by RCA Records. The official remix features verses from American rappers DRAM, Denzel Curry and Cousin Stizz on August 25, 2016.

Background
The whistle that is heard in "Chill Bill" is from a 1968 British psychological thriller film called Twisted Nerve. The film follows a man with multi-personalities on a killing spree to be closer to the woman that he loves. The whistling theme was created by composer Bernard Herrmann and was featured in the Tarantino films Kill Bill: Volume 1, Death Proof and the first season of American Horror Story.

Music video
The song's accompanying music video was posted on June 25, 2015 on Twelve O'Seven's account on YouTube. Since its release, the video has received over 223 million views.

Commercial performance
On the chart dated August 20, 2016, "Chill Bill" entered the US Billboard Hot 100 at number 97. The song peaked at number 29.

Charts and certifications

Weekly charts

Year-end charts

Certifications

References

External links

Lyrics of this song at Genius

2016 debut singles
2014 songs
RCA Records singles